Kansas's 7th congressional district for the United States House of Representatives in the state of Kansas is a defunct congressional district.

List of members representing the district

References

 Congressional Biographical Directory of the United States 1774–present

07
Former congressional districts of the United States